Erythrosuchidae (meaning "red crocodiles" in Greek) are a family of large basal archosauriform carnivores that lived from the later Early Triassic (Olenekian) to the early Middle Triassic (Anisian).

Naming
The family Erythrosuchidae was named by David Meredith Seares Watson in 1917.

Description
Their fossil remains are known to date from South Africa (Beaufort Group of the Karoo Basin), China, India and European Russia, from the Early to Middle Triassic.

Erythrosuchids were unusually large and robust archosauromorphs. Several features set them apart from other archosauriformes and are also seen in later, more derived archosaurs. For example, they lack teeth on the palate, which are found in other early archosauriformes, such as Doswellia and euparkeriids. In erythrosuchids, the centra (central parts of vertebrae) are deeply indented on either side, differing considerably from the usual cylindrical shape of the centra in early archosauriformes, but similar to later archosaurs.

The heads of erythrosuchids are generally disproportionately large and deep. In all erythrosuchids, the lower margin of the premaxilla, the bone at the tip of the upper jaw, is lower than the lower margin of the maxilla, the bone behind the premaxilla. This forms a characteristic "step" that makes erythrosuchids easily distinguishable from all other early archosauriformes, which have smooth jaw margins that are either straight or gradually curved.

Erythrosuchids are notable for being the first archosauriforms to have a triradiate pelvic girdle with three projecting areas formed from three bones: an ilium and an elongated pubis and ischium. Although it is small, the fourth trochanter, a ridge on the femur that serves as a muscle attachment in archosaurs, first appears in erythrosuchids. The triradiate pelvis and fourth trochanter are both features which indicate that erythrosuchids had an erect stance similar to later archosaurs. More basal archosauriforms such as proterosuchids lacked these features and probably had a more sprawling posture.

Classification
Erythrosuchids were formerly classified as thecodonts of the suborder Proterosuchia. This classification is no longer used by paleontologists, who now employ a cladistic approach. In this, erythrosuchids constitute an Archosauriformes clade that is an outgroup to the Archosauria proper. The presence of certain archosaurian features, such as the triradiate pelvic girdle, the fourth trochanter, and the third metatarsal longer than the fourth, indicate that erythrosuchids are closer to the true archosaurs than the Proterosuchidae, which lack these features. Thus the Erythrosuchidae occupy a transitional evolutionary position between the most primitive archisauriformes and more advanced Triassic archosaurs.

Genera

Phylogeny
Cladogram from Parrish (1992):

Below is a cladogram from Ezcurra (2016) that reexamined all historical members of the "Proterosuchia" (a polyphyletic historical group including proterosuchids and erythrosuchids). The placement of fragmentary taxa that had to be removed to increase tree resolution is indicated by dashed lines (in the most derived position that they can be confidently assigned to). Taxa that are nomina dubia are indicated by the note "dubium". Bold terminal taxa are collapsed. Ezcurra (2016) recovered a monophyletic Erythrosuchidae, although the relationship of the Long Reef form (SAM P41754) and Uralosaurus remain unknown within the family.

Paleobiology
The large contemporary kannemeyeriid dicynodonts doubtless constituted much of erythrosuchids' prey. However, the first erythrosuchids appear in the fossil record slightly earlier than the kannemeyeriids, so it must be assumed that they fed on other animals as well.

References

Sources
 Benton, M. J. (2000), Vertebrate Paleontology, 2nd Ed. Blackwell Science Ltd (2004) 3rd edition
 Carroll, R. L. (1988), Vertebrate Paleontology and Evolution, WH Freeman & Co.

External links 

 Erythrosuchidae
 Erythrosuchidae – list of species (Mikko's Phylogeny Archive)

Erythrosuchids
Prehistoric reptile families
Olenekian first appearances
Middle Triassic extinctions
Taxa named by D. M. S. Watson